Althaea is a genus of herbaceous perennial plants native to Europe, North Africa and western Asia. It includes Althaea officinalis, also known as the marshmallow plant, whence the fluffy confection got its name. They are found on the banks of rivers and in salt marshes, preferring moist, sandy soils. The stems grow to 1–2 m tall, and flower in mid summer. The leaves are palmately lobed with 3–7 lobes. Althaea species are used as food plants by the larvae of some Lepidoptera species including Bucculatrix quadrigemina.

Species
The genus formerly included a number of additional species now treated in the genus Alcea (hollyhocks).

, Plants of the World Online accepts the following species:
Althaea armeniaca Ten.
Althaea bertramii Post & Beauverd
Althaea cannabina L.
Althaea damascena Mouterde
Althaea hiri Parsa
Althaea octaviae Evenari
Althaea officinalis L.
Althaea oppenheimii Ulbr.
Althaea villosa Blatt.

Chemical constituents
The root contains starch (37%), mucilage (11%), pectin (11%), flavonoids, phenolic acids, sucrose, and asparagine.

Uses
The traditional medicinal uses of the plant are reflected in the name of the genus, which comes from the Greek althainein, meaning "to heal".

The flowers and young leaves can be eaten, and are often added to salads or are boiled and fried. The roots and stem also secrete mucilage, which is used to soften the skin, and is used in cosmetic treatments.

The Roman poet Horace refers to his own diet in his Odes, which he describes as very simple: "As for me, olives, endives, and smooth mallows provide sustenance."

The root has been used since Egyptian antiquity in a honey-sweetened confection useful in the treatment of sore throat. The later French version of the recipe, called pâte de guimauve (or "guimauve" for short), included an eggwhite meringue and was often flavored with rose water. Pâte de guimauve more closely resembles contemporary commercially available marshmallows, which no longer contain any actual marshmallow.

The root's emulsifying property is used for cleaning Persian carpets in the Middle East. It is regarded as the best method to preserve the vibrancy of vegetable dyes used in coloring the carpet's wool.

Gallery

Notes

References
Medicinal Plants of the World: Chemical Constituents, Traditional and Modern Medicinal Uses by Ivan A. Ross.

External links

Flora Europaea: Althaea

Malveae
Malvaceae genera